Sycacantha sphaerocosmana is a species of moth of the family Tortricidae. It is found in Australia, where it has been recorded from Queensland.

The wingspan is about 19 mm. The forewings are pale ochreous grey with a reddish-brown basal patch mixed with purple fuscous. The hindwings are fuscous.

References

Moths described in 1881
Olethreutini
Sycacantha